Milton Leónidas Ray Guevara (born 5 May 1948, in Samaná) is a Dominican lawyer, judge and expert constitutionalist. He is the first and current Chief Justice of the Constitutional Court of the Dominican Republic.

He was elected senator for the 1998-2002 legislative quadrennium by the Dominican Revolutionary Party; but he left the senatorial office when he was appointed Minister of Labour on 16 August 2000 and held that position until 16 August 2004.

Early life and family 
Ray Guevara was born on 5 May 1948, in Samaná to Mr. César Leónidas Ray, of African American descent, and Mrs. Ferolina Guevara.

Academic studies 
Ray Guevara graduated as Doctor in public law (mention très very) in the University of Nice, France in 1975. He graduated in law Summa cum laude at the Pontifical Catholic University Mother and Master (1965-1970). Besides he has a Master of Advanced Studies in social law, at Sorbonne in Paris, France (1984); a degree in Comparative law by the International Faculty of Comparative Law in Strasbourg, France (1976); a degree in Labour Comparative Law by the International School of Trieste, Italy (1976); and a degree in Banking Comparative law by the School of Banking Law of Barcelona, Spain (1975).

Curriculum vitae 

 Professor of Mastery in the Iberoamerican University, 2002-2011
 Professor of the Department of Juridical Sciences, Pontifical Catholic University Mother and Master, 1970-2012
 Director of the Mastery of Business Right and Economic Legislation, Pontifical Catholic University Mother and Master, 1993-1996
 Director of the Department of Juridical Sciences of the Pontificia Catholic University Mother and Master, 1988-1997
 Dean of students with rank of the Vice-chancellor of the Pontificia Catholic University Mother and Master, 1971-1972
 Current professor of the Department of Juridical Sciences, Pontificia Catholic University Mother and Master, From 1970

Chief Justice of the Constitutional Court 
Ray Guevara assumed the presidency of the Constitutional Court on 28 December 2011, sworn in by the president Leonel Fernández. His designation has not been fully accepted by some Dominican citizens, who accuse it of bias and of following guidelines from Fernández. It can be argued that the country structure is a constitutional dictatorship.  However, Guevara has been defended by many in the Dominican Republican society. On 28 March 2012, the president of the Senate, Reinaldo Pared Pérez, accused Guevara of bribing various Senate resources of unconstitutionality without previous review and ensuring that the bribes are allowed by the court.

Works and publications 
    Doctrina Jurídica Dominicana: Un Aporte Personal (Editora Taller, 1990)
 Institucionalidad y Justicia, Vol. I (co-editor con la Licda. Lidia Cabral, Editora Taller, 1993)
 Institucionalidad y Justicia, Vol. II (colaboración de la Licda. Lidia Cabral)
 Institucionalidad y Justicia, Vol. III (colaboración del Lic. Eddy Tejeda)
 Separata de Doctrina: Ambiente Conceptual para una Legislación de Grupos Financieros Bancarios (Revista Ciencias Jurídicas, Pontificia Universidad Católica Madre y Maestra, 1998)
Por un Samaná Mejor, Para un País Mejor (Gestión Senatorial 1998-2000)
La Expropiación por Causa de Utilidad Pública en República Dominicana (tesis doctoral publicada en francés)
La Guerra del Yom Kippur, Cese del Fuego, Superpotencias y Naciones Unidas (memoria para el certificado de Estudios Internacionales, Instituto de Derecho de la Paz y del Desarrollo)
El Canal de Panamá y Las Naciones Unidas (memoria para el doctorado en derecho público)
 Los Extranjeros en la Seguridad Social (memoria para el Diploma de Estudios Avanzados (DEA)) 
 Opinión Constitucional (2014)

Recognitions 
 Reconocimiento Excelencia Docente, Asistencia y Evaluación Estudiantil, Universidad Iberoamericana, UNIBE, 25 de junio de 2010
 Orden Labor Omnia Vincit, por la Asociación Iberoamericana de Derecho del Trabajo y de la Seguridad Social, noviembre de 2004
 Order of the Merit of Duarte, Sánchez and Mella, Big Degree Cross plate of silver, 2004
 Recognition by his support in the coordination and integration of the labour politics between the countries of the region. Council of Ministers of Work of Centroamérica and Dominican Republic, August 2004
 President of Honour of the First National and International Congress of Right of the Work and of the Social Security, San Pedro of Macorís, R.D. 29 June 2001
 Condecorado By the Government of France with the Order of the Legion of Honour, in the Degree of Big Official, 1999
 Recognition to his contribution and dedication to the First Course of Juridical Practice "Pasantía for Lawyers", School of Lawyers, December 1994
 Supreme of Silver Jaycee's 1994
 Condecoración By the Government of the Republic of France with the National Order of the Merit in the Degree of Big Official, 1987
 Honorary Fellow of the New York Chamber Of Commerce and Industry, November 1981

References 

1948 births
Living people
Dominican Republic judges
Pontificia Universidad Católica Madre y Maestra alumni
Dominican Republic people of African American descent
Order of Merit of Duarte, Sánchez and Mella
Dominican Revolutionary Party politicians
People from Samaná Province